The Smith, later Hamilton-Spencer-Smith, later Spencer-Smith Baronetcy, of Tring Park in the County of Hertford, is a title in the Baronetage of the United Kingdom. It was created on 11 June 1804 for Drummond Smith, with remainder to the heirs male of his niece Augusta (daughter of his eldest brother Joshua Smith, of Stoke Park, Wiltshire), wife of Charles Smith, MP, of Suttons, Essex. The latter was a descendant of Robert Smith, of Ilminster, from whom the Smith-Marriott baronets are also descended. The fifth Baronet (whose father Reverend Spencer Compton Hamilton-Spencer-Smith had assumed the additional surnames of Hamilton and Spencer in 1872, having married Mary, daughter of Admiral Cospatric Baillie-Hamilton, a descendant of Thomas Hamilton, 6th Earl of Haddington), was a member of the Military Inter-Allied Commission of Control from 1920 to 1924. The sixth Baronet discontinued the use of the surname of Hamilton.

Tring Park was acquired by the first Baronet in 1786. It was sold in 1823.

Smith, later Hamilton-Spencer-Smith, later Spencer-Smith baronets, of Tring Park (1804)

Sir Drummond Smith, 1st Baronet (1740–1816)
Sir Charles Joshua Smith, 2nd Baronet (1800–1831)
Sir Charles Cunliffe Smith, 3rd Baronet (1827–1905)
Sir Drummond Cunliffe Smith, 4th Baronet (1861–1947)
Sir Drummond Cospatric Hamilton-Spencer-Smith, 5th Baronet (1876–1955)
Sir John Hamilton Spencer-Smith, 6th Baronet (born 1947)

The heir presumptive of the baronetcy is Michael Philip Hamilton-Spencer-Smith (born 1952).

References
Kidd, Charles, Williamson, David (editors). Debrett's Peerage and Baronetage (1990 edition). New York: St Martin's Press, 1990,

External links
History of Tring Park at hertfordshire-genealogy.co.uk
 Two Teens in the Time of Austen, a research blog based on letters and diaries of the wife and sister of Sir Charles Joshua Smith, the 2nd baronet

People from Tring
Spencer-Smith
Baronetcies created with special remainders